Sandy Lick Creek is a tributary of Redbank Creek in northwest Pennsylvania in the United States.

Sandy Lick Creek arises in Sandy Township north of Lake Sabula and joins North Fork Creek to form Redbank Creek in the borough of Brookville, Jefferson County.

Political Subdivisions
The political subdivisions Sandy Lick Creek traverses, given in the order they are encountered traveling downstream, are as follows:

Sandy Township
DuBois
Sandy Township
Winslow Township
Reynoldsville
Winslow Township
Knox Township
Pine Creek Township
Brookville

Tributaries
The named tributaries of Sandy Lick Creek, given in the order they are encountered traveling downstream, are as follows:

Lake Sabula
Coal Run
Muddy Run
Narrows Creek
Gravel Lick Run
Laborde Branch
Reisinger Run
Pentz Run
Beaver Run
Clear Run
Slab Run
Wolf Run
Panther Run
Pitchpine Run
Soldier Run
Trout Run
Schoolhouse Run
O'Donnell Run
Camp Run
Fuller Run
Cable Run
Mill Creek
Fivemile Run

See also
 List of rivers of Pennsylvania
 List of tributaries of the Allegheny River

References

Rivers of Pennsylvania
Tributaries of the Allegheny River
Rivers of Jefferson County, Pennsylvania
Rivers of Clearfield County, Pennsylvania